The 2002–03 Football League (known as the Nationwide Football League for sponsorship reasons) was the 104th completed season of The Football League.

Portsmouth won the First Division by some distance, passing manager Harry Redknapp's old club, West Ham on the way down. Leicester City earned a somewhat controversial promotion, as administration and a Creditor's Voluntary Agreement wrote off much of their debt. Partly as a result of this, the League would introduce a ten-point deduction for any teams going into administration from the next season onwards. The play-offs were won by Wolves, returning to the top flight after nearly 20 years and finally allowing owner Sir Jack Hayward to see the return he wanted on his years of investment.

Grimsby Town were relegated, after struggling in the division for five years on extremely limited resources. Both Brighton and Sheffield Wednesday suffered awful starts to the season (Brighton managing only a single win from their first sixteen matches), and despite good runs of form late in the season, neither were able to survive.

Wigan won their first-ever promotion beyond the Second Division, helped by considerable investment in the team. Crewe Alexandra managed a promotion on considerably less resources, while play-off winners Cardiff City were another big-spending team that were able to earn promotion.

An ill-advised managerial change mid-season helped send Northampton down. Mansfield Town's first season out of the bottom division in over a decade ended as their previous spell had; with immediate relegation. Huddersfield started badly, and a financial crisis later in the season helped condemn them to relegation, only three years after they looked Premiership-bound. Cheltenham came close to survival, but a defeat on the final day of the season saw them return to the Third Division.

Rushden & Diamonds continued their meteoric rise, winning the Third Division title. They were helped in no small part by runners-up Hartlepool suffering a shocking late-season collapse, which cost them the title and manager Mike Newell his job. Wrexham took the last automatic promotion spot and bounced back from the previous season's relegation, as did play-off winners AFC Bournemouth.

A shock FA Cup victory over Everton did little to help Shrewsbury, and they finished bottom of the League. Exeter City were bought out pre-season in a high-profile takeover spearheaded by Uri Geller; Geller's associates proceeded to asset-strip the club, and despite a late-season run of form, Exeter fell victim to the first-ever dual relegation from the League.

Final league tables and results 

The tables and results below are reproduced here in the exact form that they can be found at The Rec.Sport.Soccer Statistics Foundation website, with home and away statistics separated. Play-off results are from the same website.

First Division

Play-offs

First Division maps

Second Division

Play-offs

Second Division maps

Third Division

Play-offs

Third Division maps

See also
2002–03 in English football
2002 in association football
2003 in association football

References

 
2002